Martin Luther King Jr. Boulevard (also known as MLK Blvd or simply King Blvd; originally Santa Barbara Avenue) is an east-west thoroughfare in Los Angeles, California. It stretches  from Obama Boulevard in  Baldwin Hills/Crenshaw to South Alameda Street in Central-Alameda. Prior to 1983, the boulevard was known as Santa Barbara Avenue.

Background
Originally 40th Street, it was renamed Santa Barbara Avenue. The street was officially renamed to MLK Blvd on January 15, 1983. The name change to honor the civil rights leader reflected the large black community in that part of Los Angeles. The name change effort was headed by Tuskegee Airman, and local businessman Celes King III.

The original location of the Sephardic Temple Tifereth Israel was at the corner of Santa Barbara Avenue and LaSalle Avenue in the West Adams neighborhood.

In a stand-up routine on the television special Bring the Pain, comedian Chris Rock once said, "Martin Luther King stood for nonviolence ... Now what's Martin Luther King? A street ... if you on Martin Luther King Boulevard, there’s some violence going down."

MLK Boulevard in Los Angeles is different than the Martin Luther King Jr. Boulevard in Lynwood, California, which is an extension of Century Boulevard. The City of Los Angeles also honored King by establishing the "Dr. Martin Luther King, Jr. Memorial Tree Grove" in the Kenneth Hahn State Recreation Area.

Public transit
MLK Blvd is served by Metro Local line 40. The K Line has a station under at Crenshaw Boulevard.

See also
Exposition Park

References

Streets in Los Angeles
Baldwin Hills, Los Angeles
Crenshaw, Los Angeles